Macalla chosenalis is a species of snout moth in the genus Macalla. It was described by Shibuya in 1927, and is known from Korea (including Shakuoji, the type location).

References

Moths described in 1927
Epipaschiinae